Dryptosauroides (meaning "similar in form to Dryptosaurus") is the name given to a dubious genus of dinosaur from the Late Cretaceous. It was a large theropod, possibly belonging to the Abelisauroidea. It has been estimated as 10 meters (33 feet) long and 1.5 tonnes (1.65 short tons) in weight.

Its fossils, consisting of six caudal vertebrae, together forming type specimens GSI IM K20/334, 609, K27/549, 601, 602 and 626, were found in India in the Lameta Formation of the Maastrichtian. The vertebrae, originally incorrectly identified as dorsals, are thirteen to fourteen centimetres long. These remains are today commonly considered to be indistinguishable from those of other theropods from the same formation. A cervical vertebra, four rib heads and a dorsal rib have also been assigned to Dryptosauroides (D .sp), but they may have belonged to a different theropod.

The type species, Dryptosauroides grandis, was named  by Friedrich von Huene in 1932 and described by him and Charles Alfred Matley in 1933. The specific name grandis means "large" in Latin.

See also

 Timeline of ceratosaur research

References

Ceratosaurs
Dinosaurs of India and Madagascar
Late Cretaceous dinosaurs
Fossil taxa described in 1933
Taxa named by Friedrich von Huene
Taxa named by Charles Alfred Matley
Nomina dubia